The third series of Warsaw Shore, a Polish television programme based in Warsaw, began airing on 29 March 2015 on MTV. The series concluded on 4 October 2015 after 16 episodes and two special episodes The Trybson's. The series was confirmed on 23 January 2015. This was the first series to feature new cast members Magda Pyznar and Damian Zduńczyk. The series featured a former cast members Paweł Trybała and Eliza Wesołowska, who returned of the show as guests.
During the third series, on 9 June 2015, it was confirmed there will be a new show with Eliza and Trybson,  former cast members from Series 1 of Warsaw Shore called Warsaw Shore: Watch with Trybsons. The series premiere of the show aired on June 21, 2015 replacing Warsaw Shore after 12 episodes. The rest of season 3 episodes aired on 30 August 2015. This was the last series to feature Paweł Cattaneo, who has been axed from the show after party at a house. Ewelina Kubiak also left the show. On 6 September 2015, it was confirmed that new cast member Klaudia Stec had joined the cast in episode 14 of the series 3.

Cast
Alan Kwieciński
Anna Ryśnik
Damian Zduńczyk
Eliza Wesołowska 
Ewelina Kubiak
Klaudia Stec 
Magda Pyznar
Anna "Mała" Aleksandrzak
Paweł Cattaneo
Paweł "Trybson" Trybała 
Wojciech Gola

Duration of cast

Notes 

Key:    = Cast member is featured in this episode.
Key:    = Cast member arrives in the house.
Key:       = Cast member leaves the series.
 Key:  = Cast member returns to the series.
Key:  = Cast member is removed from the series.
 Key:  = Cast member is not a cast member in this episode.

Episodes

References 

2015 Polish television seasons
Series 3